Nemanja Tomić (Serbian Cyrillic: Немања Томић; born 21 January 1988) is a Serbian footballer who plays for Mladost Lučani. He is often described as a "tricky" winger with sublime dribbling skill.

Club career
Tomić started his football career at hometown side Radnički Kragujevac. As a 16-year-old, he made his debut for Radnički and set a club record as the youngest senior player to debut for the club. In early 2006, Tomić received an invitation to move to Partizan, but first played two and a half seasons for Partizan's reserve team Teleoptik. During that spell his playing development was carefully monitored by the Partizan coaches and it was decided that he join the first team squad. On 20 January, in 2009, it was announced that he signed a 5-year deal for Partizan.

Partizan

2009–10
In his first season with Partizan, his new club ended up in first place in the Jelen SuperLiga. In the regular season, he featured in 29 league games and scored two goals. He played all 6 games in the 2009–10 UEFA Europa League group stage, during which he earned his first experience playing for a club in group stage of a UEFA competition.

2010–11
In the 2010–11 regular season, Tomić scored a total of four goals in 23 league games. It was also in this season during which Partizan played in the group stage of the UEFA Champions League for the first time since 2003. Tomić played three of six games that Partizan featured in Group H of the 2010–11 UEFA Champions League; in one of the games he played against Arsenal in Belgrade.

2011–2012
As of the beginning of the 2012–13 season, Tomić with Partizan has accumulated four SuperLiga titles. Throughout the first half of 2012, during which Partizan guaranteed the 2011–12 SuperLiga title under Avram Grant, Tomić reportedly attracted interest from Roma. He played five games in the 2012–13 UEFA Europa League Group H, during which he scored a goal against Inter.

Gençlerbirliği
For the first time in his life, Tomić moved abroad to Turkey and signed for Gençlerbirliği on 4 January 2013 on a three-year contract.

Trikala
On 30 August 2017 Greek Football League side Trikala announced the signing of Tomić.  On 10 December 2017 he scored twice in a 3-1 home win against Apollon Larissa.

International career
Tomić made his first appearance for the Serbia U21 on 11 February, in 2009, in a friendly match against Cyprus U21. He was selected to be a part of the Serbia squad for the 2009 European Under-21 Championship in Sweden, and given the number 22 shirt. In the final tournament, he came in as a substitute in the all three group matches. Tomić made his debut for the Serbian senior team in a friendly match against Japan on 7 April, in 2010. Serbia won the match 3–0, with Tomić scoring Serbia's third goal from a free kick. In November 2011, he was additionally called up to the team for two friendly matches against Mexico and Honduras.

Controversy in Croatia
On 13 October 2009, Nemanja Tomić scored a goal against Croatia U21 and celebrated by gesturing his hands resembling the shooting of firearms in the direction of the Croatian supporters. As a result, UEFA gave him a temporary match ban.

Career statistics

International goals

Honours

Club
Partizan
 Serbian League (4): 2008–09, 2009–10, 2010–11, 2011–12
 Serbian Cup (2): 2008–09, 2010–11

Individual
 Serbian League Team of the Year (1): 2008–09

References

External links
 Nemanja Tomić at utakmica.rs
 Nemanja Tomić at reprezentacija.rs
 

1988 births
Living people
Sportspeople from Kragujevac
Serbian footballers
Association football wingers
Serbia international footballers
Serbia under-21 international footballers
FK Teleoptik players
FK Partizan players
FK Zemun players
FK Radnički Niš players
Gençlerbirliği S.K. footballers
FK Radnik Surdulica players
Serbian SuperLiga players
Süper Lig players
Serbian expatriate footballers
Expatriate footballers in Turkey
Serbian expatriate sportspeople in Turkey
Trikala F.C. players